Saint-Carné is a commune in the Côtes-d'Armor department of Brittany in northwestern France.

Population
Inhabitants of Saint-Carné are called carnéens in French.

See also
Communes of the Côtes-d'Armor department

References

External links

Official website
Saint-Carné 

Communes of Côtes-d'Armor